Halldór Eggert Sigurðsson (9 September 1915 – 25 May 2003) was an Icelandic politician and former Minister of Finance of Iceland from 1971 until 1974.

References

External links 
 Non auto-biography of Halldór Eggert Sigurðsson on the parliament website

1915 births
2003 deaths
Halldor Eggert Sigurdsson
Halldor Eggert Sigurdsson
Halldor Eggert Sigurdsson